HD 170469 b is a gas giant exoplanet located approximately 212 light-years away in the constellation Ophiuchus, orbiting the star HD 170469. This planet was discovered in April 2007. The star is 1.1 solar mass and the planet is at least 67% the mass of Jupiter, orbiting about half the distance of Jupiter from the Sun. The mass value is only minimum since the inclination is unknown.

The orbital distance is more than twice the distance from Earth to the Sun, although taking over three Earth years to orbit the star. The combined distance and period would make orbital velocity of 19.8 km/s, slower than Earth's 29.8 km/s.

References

External links 
 

Exoplanets discovered in 2007
Giant planets
Ophiuchus (constellation)
Exoplanets detected by radial velocity